The Shawnee darter (Etheostoma tecumsehi) is a species of freshwater ray-finned fish, a darter from the subfamily Etheostomatinae, part of the family Percidae, which also contains the perches, ruffes and pikeperches. It is endemic to the eastern United States, where it occurs in the upper Pond River in Kentucky. It inhabits shallow gravel riffles and rocky runs and pools of headwaters, creeks, and small rivers.

References

Etheostoma
Fish described in 1997
Taxa named by Patrick A. Ceas
Taxa named by Lawrence M. Page